The 1944 Colorado Buffaloes football team was an American football team that represented the University of Colorado as a member of the Mountain States Conference (MSC) during the 1944 college football season. Frank Potts returned for his second season as head coach after having helmed the team in 1940. Colorado compiled an overall record of 6–2 with mark of 2–0 in conference play, winning the MSC title. The team's home field of Colorado Stadium was renamed Folsom Field in 1944, following the death of former head coach Fred Folsom.

Schedule

References

Colorado
Colorado Buffaloes football seasons
Mountain States Conference football champion seasons
Colorado Buffaloes football